The PTS Mannose-Fructose-Sorbose (Man) Family (TC# 4.A.6) is a group of multicomponent PTS systems that are involved in sugar uptake in bacteria. This transport process is dependent on several cytoplasmic phosphoryl transfer proteins - Enzyme I (I), HPr, Enzyme IIA (IIA), and Enzyme IIB (IIB) as well as the integral membrane sugar permease complex (IICD). It is not part of the PTS-AG or PTS-GFL superfamilies.

Distinguishing characteristics from other PTS porters 
The Man Family is unique in several respects among other PTS porter families:

 It is the only PTS family in which members possess a IID protein;
 It is the only PTS family in which the IIB constituent is phosphorylated on a histidyl rather than a cysteyl residue;
 Its porter members usually exhibit broad specificity for a range of sugars, rather than being specific for just one or a few sugars.

The mannose porter of Escherichia coli, for example, can transport and phosphorylate glucose, mannose, fructose, glucosamine, N-acetylglucosamine, and N-acteylmannosamine.

Structure 
The structure of the E. coli IIAMan domain has been shown to exhibit an α/β doubly wound superfold. The IIB domain also exhibits an α/β doubly wound superfold, but it is very dissimilar from that of the IIA domain. Instead, it has the same topology as phosphoglyceromutase (PGM). Since both proteins (IIBMan and PGM) catalyze phosphoryl transfer with a phosphohistidine intermediate, both proteins show a similar distribution of active site residues, and both exhibit similar structures, they are probably homologous.

IICMan of E. coli has been reported to have six transmembrane α-helical segments, while IIDMan was reported to have only one. However, hydropathy plots show multiple peaks of hydropathy, rendering the experimental result, suggesting 1 TMS, questionable. These two proteins together are required for transport, although IICMan is presumed to comprise all or most of the sugar transporting channel.

Transport reaction 
The generalized reaction catalyzed by members of the Man Family is: 
 Sugar (out) + PEP (in) → Sugar-P (in) + pyruvate (in)

References 

Membrane proteins
Protein families